Florin W. Floyd was an American pole vaulter. On February 27, 1916 he set a world indoor record at 3.87 m. He cleared 3.81 m outdoors at the U.S. Championships later that year, which was only enough for a bronze medal. In 1919, Floyd won the pole vault at the Inter-Allied Games.

References

1894 births
Date of death unknown
American male pole vaulters